D. Ralph Bouch (May 11, 1932 – February 7, 2016) was an American football and wrestling coach. He served as the head football coach at West Virginia Wesleyan College in Buckhannon, West Virginia from 1969 to 1972. He previously served as a wrestling coach and assistant football coach at Westminster College in New Wilmington, Pennsylvania.

References

External links
 

1932 births
2016 deaths
Clarion Golden Eagles football players
West Virginia Wesleyan Bobcats football coaches
Westminster Titans football coaches
College wrestling coaches in the United States
Sportspeople from Pittsburgh
Players of American football from Pittsburgh